Holoby is an urban-type settlement in Kovel Raion of Volyn Oblast in Ukraine. Population:

Economy

Transportation
Holoby railway station is on a railway connecting Rivne and Kovel. There is intensive passenger traffic.

The settlement to Highway M19 connecting Chernivtsi via Ternopil and Lutsk with Kovel.

References

Urban-type settlements in Kovel Raion